The 2014 election of the Speaker of the New Zealand House of Representatives occurred on 20 October 2014, following the 2014 general election result. The election resulted in the re-election of National Party MP David Carter as Speaker.

Nominated candidates
 Rt Hon David Carter, List MP – National Party
 Ron Mark, List MP – New Zealand First

Election
The election was conducted by means of a conventional parliamentary motion. The Clerk of the House of Representatives conducted a vote on the question of the election of the Speaker, in accordance with Standing Order 19.

The following table gives the election results:

How each MP voted:

References

Speaker of the House of Representatives election
Speaker of the House of Representatives election
Speaker of the House of Representatives of New Zealand elections